Broadway–Middle Historic District is a national historic district located at Cape Girardeau, Cape Girardeau County, Missouri.  The district encompasses 24 contributing buildings in the central business district of Cape Girardeau.  It developed between about 1868 and 1957, and includes representative examples of Greek Revival, Italianate, and Mission Revival style architecture.  Notable buildings include Walther's Furniture and Undertaking (1916), I. Ben Miller Store (c. 1915), Lueders Studio (c. 1925), Graessle Building (c. 1908), Charles Rueseler Building (c. 1880), and A.C. Vasterling Building (c. 1903).

It was listed on the National Register of Historic Places in 2007 with a boundary increase in 2013.

References

Historic districts on the National Register of Historic Places in Missouri
Commercial buildings on the National Register of Historic Places in Missouri
Greek Revival architecture in Missouri
Italianate architecture in Missouri
Mission Revival architecture in Missouri
Historic districts in Cape Girardeau County, Missouri
National Register of Historic Places in Cape Girardeau County, Missouri